The Denmark men's national 3x3 team represents Denmark in international 3x3 basketball matches and is governed by the Danish Basketball Association.

See also
Denmark national basketball team

References

Basketball in Denmark
Basketball teams in Denmark
Men's national 3x3 basketball teams
Basketball